Hollywood Vampires is an American rock supergroup formed in 2012 by Alice Cooper, Johnny Depp, and Joe Perry. The band name derives from The Hollywood Vampires, a celebrity drinking club formed by Cooper in the 1970s which included but was not limited to: John Lennon and Ringo Starr of the Beatles, Harry Nilsson, Keith Moon of the Who, and Micky Dolenz of the Monkees. Touring members include or have included Duff McKagan and Matt Sorum of Guns N' Roses fame, as well as Robert DeLeo from Stone Temple Pilots.

The band has released two studio albums featuring guest appearances by Paul McCartney, Dave Grohl, Joe Walsh, Zak Starkey and Christopher Lee, among others. Cooper and Perry have discussed plans for a future live album, stating that Depp's schedule works differently than theirs.

Origins

The band originally takes its name from a drinking club consisting of mainly Cooper, Keith Moon, Ringo Starr, Micky Dolenz and Harry Nilsson with additional members including John Lennon. The mission of the original Hollywood Vampires was to drink until no one could stand up. This took place during the height of Cooper's drinking in the 1970s. Cooper talks in more detail about the Rainbow Bar incarnation of the Hollywood Vampires in the 1991 video biography Prime Cuts.

Live performances

The group's debut live performances were held at Roxy Theatre (West Hollywood) in Los Angeles across September 16 and 17, 2015. The three core members were accompanied by bassist Duff McKagan, drummer Matt Sorum, rhythm guitarist Tommy Henriksen, and Bruce Witkin on keyboards and additional guitar. Guest performers for both nights were Tom Morello, Geezer Butler, Perry Farrell, Zak Starkey, and Kesha, and Marilyn Manson guesting on the second night. The next week, the group performed at Brazil's Rock in Rio festival on September 24, 2015, and was webcast live by AOL. Guest performers were, Lzzy Hale, Zak Starkey, and Andreas Kisser.

In February 2016, the group performed at the Grammy Award ceremony as a tribute to Lemmy, who had died at the end of 2015. The group also announced their first concert tour, which began at Turning Stone Resort & Casino on May 24. The group was scheduled to make their first late-night television appearance on The Late Show with Stephen Colbert on July 11, 2016; however, lead guitarist and co-founder Perry collapsed on stage during a performance on July 10. The band continued to perform without Perry prior to his return to the tour on July 22. The group made their first late-night television appearance on Jimmy Kimmel Live! on June 19, 2019.

In June 2022, the band announced a new tour to take place in Europe (5 in Germany, 1 in Luxembourg and Turkey). The dates are set for June 2023 and will feature Joe Perry, Alice Cooper, Johnny Depp and Tommy Henriksen.

Band members

Current members
 Alice Cooper – lead and backing vocals, harmonica, rhythm guitar (2012–present)
 Johnny Depp – slide, rhythm and lead guitar, backing and lead vocals, keyboards (2012–present)
 Joe Perry – lead and rhythm guitar, backing and lead vocals (2012–present)
 Tommy Henriksen – rhythm and lead guitar, keyboards, backing vocals <small>(2022–present)

Current touring musicians
 Glen Sobel – drums (2017–present)
 Chris Wyse – bass, backing vocals (2018–present)
 Buck Johnson – keyboards, rhythm and lead guitar, backing vocals (2018–present)

Former touring musicians
 Duff McKagan – bass, backing vocals (2015–2016)
 Brad Whitford – rhythm and lead guitar (2017)
 Matt Sorum – drums, backing and lead vocals (2015–2017)
 Bruce Witkin – bass, keyboards, rhythm and lead guitar, percussion, backing and lead vocals (2015–2017)
 Robert DeLeo – bass, backing vocals (2016–2017)

Session musicians
 Bruce Witkin – bass, keyboards, rhythm and lead guitar, percussion, backing and lead vocals (2012–2015)
 Glen Sobel – drums (2012–2015)
 Tommy Henriksen – rhythm and lead guitar, keyboards, backing vocals (2012–2019)

Timeline
This is an approximate timeline of Hollywood Vampires members and their touring band.

Discography
Studio albums
 Hollywood Vampires (2015)
 Rise (2019)

References

External links 
 
 
 

Rock music supergroups
Musical groups established in 2015
American musical trios
Tribute bands
Hard rock musical groups from California
Alice Cooper
Johnny Depp
2015 establishments in California